Giovanni Lavaggi (born 18 February 1958) is an Italian racing driver.

Despite Lavaggi being a nobleman by background, he couldn’t count on personal financial resources; therefore he started racing only at the age of 26. Nevertheless, he managed to reach the top class of motorsport, racing in Formula One in ‘95 and ‘96. His first involvement in F1 was in 1992 when, being a mechanical engineer, he was official test driver for the March F1 team. In 1995, he drove for Lotus-Pacific for four races in which he was forced to retire due to gearbox problems. In the second part of 1996 racing season, he joined the Minardi team for six races. His best result was a tenth place at the Hungaroring, which was the second best result of the year for Minardi team.

He lives in Monte Carlo.

Early life
Lavaggi was born in Augusta, Sicily on 18 February 1958, being of noble heritage. He studied mechanical engineering at Milan Polytechnic.

Racing career
Lavaggi's racing career started in 1984, inspired by Henry Morrogh who judged him the best student he ever had at his racing school. That year he was official driver of the constructor Ermolli in the Italian Formula Panda championship where he was classified second, winning more races than any other driver. Not having enough sponsorship to afford a whole season in Formula Three, he did a few races in the Italian Formula Three Championship before turning to Group C sports cars, in order to gain international experience. In this category, he soon became a driver for the Porsche Kremer Team, for whom he became the 1993 Interserie champion, winning six of the season's total of 12 races and taking four further podium finishes. He also won the 1995 Daytona 24 Hours, driving nine hours in a team of four drivers. He scored two more wins in the FIA Sportscar Championship, including the 1000 km of Monza, where he drove five of the race's six hours and took five more podium places and two pole positions.
His first race in F1 was at the German Grand Prix for Pacific in 1995. Prior to this he was a test driver for March during the 1992 season. He tested the Pacific PR02 twice before his first race for the British team - once at Silverstone and once at Snetterton. He was a rookie, but, at the same time, being 35 years old, he was the oldest driver in the field; therefore, he had to fight against the scepticism of the F1 media. The Pacific PR02 was an unreliable machine and he retired from all 4 races in 1995. His last experience in F1 was the 1996 Bologna Motorshow. Racing in a Minardi against two Benettons (driven by Jarno Trulli and Giancarlo Fisichella), two Ligiers (Olivier Panis and Shinji Nakano) and the other Minardi (Tarso Marques), he finished second, losing the final against Fisichella by a nose.

After his F1 career, Lavaggi founded his own team “Scuderia Lavaggi” and in 2006 he became a constructor designing and building his own Le Mans Prototype, the Lavaggi LS1. He raced the car in the Le Mans Series until 2009 and he scored a pole position at 2008 Vallelunga 6h. Lavaggi is the only example of a driver-constructor in the modern era of motorsport at high-level.

He was nicknamed "Johnny Carwash" (an approximate translation of his name from Italian to English, John Washes) by people in the paddock; US talk show host David Letterman helped bring the nickname to popular attention.

Family
The Lavaggi noble family moved from Genoa to Sicily (Palermo) in 1420 and then from Palermo to Augusta in 1711. A cousin of Giovanni’s grandfather, also called Giovanni Lavaggi, was a war hero. He was a pilot of the Italian Air Force and he died because of the sabotage of his airplane, while bringing to Asmara the Italian minister of public works Luigi Razza, who also was killed in the crash. In the cities of Catania and Augusta, Via Giovanni Lavaggi (Giovanni Lavaggi Road) is named after him.

Racing record

Complete 24 Hours of Le Mans results

Complete International Formula 3000 results
(key) (Races in bold indicate pole position; races in italics indicate fastest lap.)

American Open-Wheel racing results
(key) (Races in bold indicate pole position, races in italics indicate fastest race lap)

PPG Indycar Series
(key) (Races in bold indicate pole position)

Complete Formula One results
(key)

References

External links
 Profile on F1 Rejects
 Driver Website
 Race Team Website
 Racing Reference profile
 Driver database profile

1958 births
Living people
People from Augusta, Sicily
Italian racing drivers
International Formula 3000 drivers
Champ Car drivers
Italian Formula One drivers
Pacific Formula One drivers
Minardi Formula One drivers
24 Hours of Le Mans drivers
Speedcar Series drivers
24 Hours of Daytona drivers
European Le Mans Series drivers
World Sportscar Championship drivers
Superstars Series drivers
Sportspeople from the Province of Syracuse
EuroInternational drivers